Eşmedere can refer to the following villages in Turkey:

 Eşmedere, Kalecik
 Eşmedere, Sındırgı